Georgios Liavas (born 12 February 2001) is a Greek professional footballer who plays as a defender for Super League club Panetolikos.

Career

Panetolikos
Liavas made his debut at the start of the 2018–19 season and became a mainstay in a solid Panetolikos side under Traianos Dellas. At age 17, Liavas became the second youngest Panetolikos player in the Superleague. He can play either right back, left back, and defensive midfield, and became one of Panetolikos’ most prized assets.

Liavas suffered a serious knee injury in January 2021, followed by a similar injury to his other knee, which kept him from playing for over a year. He returned to play regularly for Panetolikos in May 2022.

Style of play
Liavas is a versatile player, who can play in either the left back, right back and defensive midfielder positions.

Career statistics

Club

References

2001 births
Living people
Greek footballers
Panetolikos F.C. players
Greece under-21 international footballers
Greece youth international footballers
Super League Greece players
Association football defenders
People from Xiromero
Footballers from Western Greece